The Chihuahua (Southeastern) tradition (c. 6000 BC – c. AD 250) as a culture of south-central New Mexico and Chihuahua is still poorly defined.  It probably includes several local adaptations that evolved over long periods of time.  Irwin-Williams' hypothesis of four interacting Southwestern Archaic traditions, which differ from other traditions such as the Plains Archaic, is still provisional.

See also
 Cochise tradition
 Archaic period in the Americas
 Archaic stage
 Pecos Classification
 Southwestern United States

Bibliography
 Cordell, Linda S. (1984). Prehistory of the Southwest. New York: Academic Press.
 Fagan, Brian M. (2000). Ancient North America: The archaeology of a continent (3rd ed.). New York: Thames and Hudson.
 Irwin-Williams, Cynthia. (1979). Post-pleistocene archeology, 7000-2000 B.C. In A. Ortiz (Ed.), Handbook of North American Indians: Southwest (Vol. 9, pp. 31–42). Washington, D.C.: Smithsonian Institution.

Archaic period in North America
Archaeological cultures of North America
Pre-Columbian cultures
Native American history of New Mexico
Southwest tribes
Oasisamerica cultures